The term chloride refers either to a chloride ion, which is negatively charged chlorine atom, or a non-charged chlorine atom covalently bonded to the rest of the molecule by a single bond. Many inorganic chlorides are salts. Many organic compounds are chlorides.

The chloride ion is an anion (negatively charged ion) with the charge Cl-. Chloride salts such as sodium chloride are often soluble in water. It is an essential electrolyte located in all body fluids responsible for maintaining acid/base balance, transmitting nerve impulses and regulating liquid flow in and out of cells. Other examples of ionic chlorides are calcium chloride  and ammonium chloride .

The chloride is also a neutral chlorine atom covalently bonded by a single bond to the rest of the molecule. For example, methyl chloride  is an organic compound with a covalent C−Cl bond in which the chlorine is not an anion. Other examples of covalent chlorides are carbon tetrachloride , sulfuryl chloride  and monochloramine .

Electronic properties
A chloride ion (diameter 167 pm) is much larger than a chlorine atom (diameter 99 pm). The chlorine atom's hold on the valence shell is weaker because the chloride anion has one more electron than it does. The ion is colorless and diamagnetic. In aqueous solution, it is highly soluble in most cases; however, for some chloride salts, such as silver chloride, lead(II) chloride, and mercury(I) chloride, they are only slightly soluble in water. In aqueous solution, chloride is bonded by the protic end of the water molecules.

Reactions of chloride
Chloride can be oxidized but not reduced. The first oxidation, as employed in the chlor-alkali process, is conversion to chlorine gas. Chlorine can be further oxidized to other oxides and oxyanions including hypochlorite (ClO−, the active ingredient in chlorine bleach), chlorine dioxide (ClO2), chlorate, and perchlorate.

In terms of its acid–base properties, chloride is a weak base as indicated by the negative value of the pKa of hydrochloric acid. Chloride can be protonated by strong acids, such as sulfuric acid:
NaCl + H2SO4 → NaHSO4 + HCl

Ionic chloride salts reaction with other salts to exchange anions. The presence of halide ions like chloride can be detected using silver nitrate. A solution containing chloride ions will produce a white silver chloride precipitate:
Cl− + Ag+ → AgCl

The concentration of chloride in an assay can be determined using a chloridometer, which detects silver ions once all chloride in the assay has precipitated via this reaction.

Chlorided silver electrodes are commonly used in  electrophysiology.

Other oxyanions
Chlorine can assume oxidation states of −1, +1, +3, +5, or +7. Several neutral chlorine oxides are also known.

{| class="wikitable"
|-
! Chlorine oxidation state
| −1
| +1
| +3
| +5
| +7
|-
! Name
| chloride
| hypochlorite
| chlorite
| chlorate
| perchlorate
|-
! Formula
| Cl−
| ClO−
| 
| 
| 
|-
! Structure
| 
| 
| 
| 
| 
|}

Occurrence in nature
In nature, chloride is found primarily in seawater, which has a chloride ion concentration of 19400 mg/liter. Smaller quantities, though at higher concentrations, occur in certain inland seas and in subterranean brine wells, such as the Great Salt Lake in Utah and the Dead Sea in Israel. 
Most chloride salts are soluble in water, thus, chloride-containing minerals are usually only found in abundance in dry climates or deep underground. Some chloride-containing minerals include halite (sodium chloride NaCl), sylvite (potassium chloride KCl), bischofite (MgCl2∙6H2O), carnallite (KCl∙MgCl2∙6H2O), and kainite (KCl∙MgSO4∙3H2O). It is also found in evaporite minerals such as chlorapatite and sodalite.

Role in biology
Chloride has a major physiological significance, which includes regulation of osmotic pressure, electrolyte balance and acid-base homeostasis. Chloride is present in all body fluids, and is the most abundant extracellular anion which accounts for around one third of extracellular fluid's tonicity.

Chloride is an essential electrolyte, playing a key role in maintaining cell homeostasis and transmitting action potentials in neurons. It can flow through chloride channels (including the GABAA receptor) and is transported by KCC2 and NKCC2 transporters.

Chloride is usually (though not always) at a higher extracellular concentration, causing it to have a negative reversal potential (around −61 mV at 37 °C in a mammalian cell). Characteristic concentrations of chloride in model organisms are: in both E. coli and budding yeast are 10–200 mM (dependent on medium), in mammalian cells 5–100 mM and in blood plasma 100 mM.

The concentration of chloride in the blood is called serum chloride, and this concentration is regulated by the kidneys. A chloride ion is a structural component of some proteins; for example, it is present in the amylase enzyme. For these roles, chloride is one of the essential dietary mineral (listed by its element name chlorine). Serum chloride levels are mainly regulated by the kidneys through a variety of transporters that are present along the nephron. Most of the chloride, which is filtered by the glomerulus, is reabsorbed by both proximal and distal tubules (majorly by proximal tubule) by both active and passive transport.

Corrosion

The presence of chlorides, such as in seawater, significantly worsens the conditions for pitting corrosion of most metals (including stainless steels, aluminum and high-alloyed materials). Chloride-induced corrosion of steel in concrete lead to a local breakdown of the protective oxide form in alkaline concrete, so that a subsequent localized corrosion attack takes place.

Environmental threats
Increased concentrations of chloride can cause a number of ecological effects in both aquatic and terrestrial environments. It may contribute to the acidification of streams, mobilize radioactive soil metals by ion exchange, affect the mortality and reproduction of aquatic plants and animals, promote the invasion of saltwater organisms into previously freshwater environments, and interfere with the natural mixing of lakes. Sodium chloride has also been shown to change the composition of microbial species at relatively low concentrations. It can also hinder the denitrification process, a microbial process essential to nitrate removal and the conservation of water quality, and inhibit the nitrification and respiration of organic matter.

Production
The chlor-alkali industry is a major consumer of the world's energy budget. This process converts sodium chloride into chlorine and sodium hydroxide, which are used to make many other materials and chemicals. The process involves two parallel reactions:
2 Cl− →  + 2 e−
2  + 2 e− → H2 + 2 OH−

Examples and uses
An example is table salt, which is sodium chloride with the chemical formula NaCl. In water, it dissociates into Na+ and Cl− ions. Salts such as calcium chloride, magnesium chloride, potassium chloride have varied uses ranging from medical treatments to cement formation.

Calcium chloride (CaCl2) is a salt that is marketed in pellet form for removing dampness from rooms. Calcium chloride is also used for maintaining unpaved roads and for fortifying roadbases for new construction. In addition, calcium chloride is widely used as a de-icer, since it is effective in lowering the melting point when applied to ice.

Examples of covalently-bonded chlorides are phosphorus trichloride, phosphorus pentachloride, and thionyl chloride, all three of which are reactive chlorinating reagents that have been used in a laboratory.

Water quality and processing
A major application involving chloride is desalination, which involves the energy intensive removal of chloride salts to give potable water. In the petroleum industry, the chlorides are a closely monitored constituent of the mud system. An increase of the chlorides in the mud system may be an indication of drilling into a high-pressure saltwater formation. Its increase can also indicate the poor quality of a target sand.

Chloride is also a useful and reliable chemical indicator of river and groundwater fecal contamination, as chloride is a non-reactive solute and ubiquitous to sewage and potable water. Many water regulating companies around the world utilize chloride to check the contamination levels of the rivers and potable water sources.

Food
Chloride salts such as sodium chloride are used to preserve food and as nutrients or condiments.

See also 
 Halide (compounds of halogens)
 Renal chloride reabsorption

References 

Anions
 
Leaving groups
Dietary minerals